Taje LaQuane Allen (born November 6, 1973) is a former professional American football player who played cornerback for six seasons for the St. Louis Rams and Kansas City Chiefs in the National Football League.

References

1973 births
Living people
Sportspeople from Lubbock, Texas
American football cornerbacks
Texas Longhorns football players
St. Louis Rams players
Kansas City Chiefs players
Players of American football from Texas